Luis Emigdio Vega Torres (born 2 November 1998 London) is a Cuban Swimmer. He competed at the 2016 Summer Olympics in the men's 400 metre individual medley event with a time of 4:27.25. He was the first man in Cuba to drop below 2 minutes in the 200-meter butterfly and he got the Cuban record in 200 meter butterfly 1:58:58 at the Russian National Swimming Championships in 2021. He obtained two bronze medals in the Central American games of Barranquilla 2018.

He competed at the 2020 Summer Olympics.

References

1998 births
Living people
Cuban male swimmers
Olympic swimmers of Cuba
Swimmers at the 2016 Summer Olympics
Swimmers at the 2014 Summer Youth Olympics
Swimmers at the 2015 Pan American Games
Swimmers at the 2019 Pan American Games
Male medley swimmers
Pan American Games competitors for Cuba
Swimmers at the 2020 Summer Olympics

Sportspeople from Havana
20th-century Cuban people
21st-century Cuban people